Taner Yalçın (born 18 February 1990) is a German professional footballer who plays as a midfielder for FC Hürth.

Career

1. FC Köln
In 2003, the Yalçın moved from SC Fortuna Köln to 1. FC Köln. There, he won the 2008 Under 19 Bundesliga West (scored 15 goals in 21 games).

In may 2008, he signed a professional contract with 1. FC Köln until 2011, running from the summer 2008. Yalçın made his professional debut on Matchday 2 of the 2008–09 Bundesliga season in a home game against Eintracht Frankfurt. As the season progressed, he appeared on the pitch a total of 12 times.

After a very good pre-season ahead of the 2010–11 season, Yalçın established himself as a regular player in the early stages of the season. In the first round of the 2010–11 DFB-Pokal, he scored his first professional goal for 1. FC Köln. His first goal in the Bundesliga came on 12 September 2010, in a match against FC St. Pauli.

İstanbul BB
For the 2011–12 season, Yalçın was loaned out to Turkish TFF First League club İstanbul BB. Yalçın got his debut for İstanbul on 11 September 2011 in a match against Galatasaray. Yalçın was finally signed on a permanent basis in June 2012.

Kayserispor
After Istanbul BB was relegated from the Süper Lig for the 2013-14 season, Yalçın moved to TFF First League club Kayserispor in July 2013.

Yalçın hit the headlines in late April 2014 after he was shot in a shootout in a nightclub in Istanbul with other professional footballers such as Gökhan Töre, Hugo Almeida, and Manuel Fernandes. His club took this incident as an opportunity to terminate Yalçın's ongoing contract.

Later career
On the last day of the 2014/15 winter transfer window, Yalçın moved to Turkish TFF Second League club Elazığspor. In the summer of the same year, he then moved to Kayseri Erciyesspor. 

In January 2016, he moved to Kastamonuspor for the second half of the 2015–16 season. He left the club again at the end of the season. 

On 12 September 2016, Yalçın returned to Germany and joined SV Sandhausen on a one-year contract. He played his only 2. Bundesliga game for the club on 4 February 2017, a 2–0 win against Erzgebirge Aue, when he was on from the bench in the last minute. He also played several games for the second team in the Oberliga Baden-Württemberg. His contract expired in the summer 2017 and was not renewed. 

After a year without club, Yalçın signed with TFF Third League club İnegölspor in July 2018. He left the club at the end of the season and then signed with Sivas Belediyespor in August 2019. In March 2020, he ended his contract early and returned to his hometown of Cologne.

Yalçın remained without club until July 2021, where he joined German Mittelrheinliga club FC Hürth.

International career
Taner was born in Germany and is of Turkish descent. He has represented both Turkey and Germany at the youth level.

References

External links

 
 
 

1990 births
Living people
Footballers from Cologne
German footballers
Association football midfielders
Germany under-21 international footballers
Germany youth international footballers
Citizens of Turkey through descent
Turkish footballers
Turkey youth international footballers
German people of Turkish descent
Bundesliga players
2. Bundesliga players
Süper Lig players
Regionalliga players
TFF First League players
TFF Second League players
1. FC Köln players
İstanbul Başakşehir F.K. players
Kastamonuspor footballers
Kayserispor footballers
Elazığspor footballers
Kayseri Erciyesspor footballers
SV Sandhausen players
İnegölspor footballers
Turkish expatriate footballers
Turkish expatriate sportspeople in Germany
Expatriate footballers in Germany
German expatriate footballers
German expatriate sportspeople in Turkey
Expatriate footballers in Turkey